Meterana tartarea is a moth of the family Noctuidae. It was described by Arthur Gardiner Butler in 1877. It is endemic to New Zealand.

References

External links

 Meterana vitiosa in species id

Moths described in 1887
Moths of New Zealand
Hadeninae
Endemic fauna of New Zealand
Endemic moths of New Zealand